Habronattus coecatus is a species of jumping spider that can be found in Mexico, the United States, and Bermuda.

Description
The spider is mostly black, with bands of tan scales. The male clypeus is covered with red scales.

References

External links
 

Salticidae
Spiders of North America
Spiders described in 1846